A republican guard, sometimes called a national guard, is a state organization of a country (often a republic, hence the name Republican) which typically serves to protect the head of state and the government, and thus is often synonymous with a presidential guard. The term is derived from the original French Gendarmerie unit. Several other countries also have adopted the term and have active guard units.

Active republican guard units

  Albanian Republican Guard
  Algerian Republican Guard
  Central African Republican Guard — Made up of supporters of President François Bozizé, who helped him rise to power in the 2003 Central African Republic coup d'état. Its current status remains uncertain.
  Congolese Republican Guard — Protects President Félix Tshisekedi of the Democratic Republic of the Congo.
  Republican Guard (Donetsk People's Republic)
  Egyptian Republican Guard
  Republican Guard (Ethiopia)
  French Republican Guard — The original Republican Guard, serves as an honor guard and defends Paris. Part of the French Gendarmerie.
  Gabonese Republican Guard
  Guinean Republican Guard
  Republican National Guard
  Ivorian Republican Guard
  Kazakh Republican Guard — A separate branch of the Armed Forces of the Republic of Kazakhstan.
  Lebanese Republican Guard — A military force of the Directorate-General of the Presidency of Lebanon.
  Portuguese Republican National Guard
  Togolese Republican Guard 
  South Ossetian Republican Guard
  Sudanese Republican Guard
  Syrian Republican Guard
  Yemeni Republican Guard

Defunct republican guards
  Dutch Blue Guards (defunct)
  Iraqi Republican Guard (defunct)
 Iraqi Special Republican Guard — A military force formed from the Iraqi Republican Guard and charged with Saddam Hussein's protection.
 Fedayeen Saddam – Paramilitary force loyal to Saddam Hussein. 
  Italian National Republican Guard (defunct)
  Peruvian Republican Guard (defunct)
  Moldovan Republican Guard (defunct)
  Transnistrian Republican Guard (defunct)
  Spanish National Republican Guard (defunct)

See also
Presidential Guard (disambiguation)
National Guard

Types of military forces
Gendarmerie